St Marys railway station may refer to:
St Marys railway station, Sydney, NSW, Australia
St. Marys station (Ontario), Canada
St. Marys Junction station, Ontario, Canada
St. Mary's railway station (England), disused railway station in the village of Ramsey St Mary's, Cambridgeshire, England
Wisbech St Mary railway station, disused railway station in the village of Wisbech St Mary, Cambridgeshire, England
St. Mary's (Whitechapel Road) tube station, disused underground station in Whitechapel, London, UK